Otto-Pekka Jurvainen (born 1 February 1985) is a Finnish footballer, who represents HIFK in the Veikkausliiga, the premier division of football in Finland.

He is a former youth talent of Puistolan Urheilijat of Helsinki. He has played for HJK as a youth player as well. He has represented Finnish national team on different youth levels on 33 occasions. He made his debut in the highest level of Finnish football, Veikkausliiga, on 13 May 2004. During that season, he played in 6 matches in the league for HJK and in 9 matches for the reserve team Klubi 04.

After his spell in HJK, he moved to Atlantis FC in 2005 to play Ykkönen. The next season in 2006, he played for Käpylän Pallo who played in Kakkonen, the third level of Finnish football. The next season, he moved to play for PK-35 of Vantaa, who played on the second highest level in Ykkönen. Jurvainen spent seven years in PK-35 before joining HIFK after the season of 2014, who were promoted to Veikkausliiga.

References 

Finnish footballers
Finland youth international footballers
Association football midfielders
Veikkausliiga players
HIFK Fotboll players
1985 births
Living people
Klubi 04 players
Käpylän Pallo players
Helsingin Jalkapalloklubi players
Footballers from Helsinki